Odisha Day, also Utkala Dibasa, is celebrated on 1 April in the Indian state of Odisha in memory of the formation of the state as a separate state out of Bihar and Orissa Province with addition of Koraput District and Ganjam District from the Madras Presidency on 1 April 1936.
After losing its political identity completely in 1568 following the defeat and demise of the last king Mukunda Dev, efforts resulted in the formation of a politically separate state under British rule on a linguistic basis on 1 April 1936.

State history
The main revolution in this separate state continued for three decades from the very day of formation of Utkal Sammilani that led to the foundation of a separate Odisha Province. The movement turned more intense under the leadership of Utkala Gouraba Madhusudan Das, Utkala mani Gopabandhu Das, Maharaja SriRam Chandra Bhanj Deo, Maharaja Krushna Chandra Gajapati, Pandit Nilkantha Das, Fakir Mohan Senapati, Dewan Athar Mohammad, Gangadhar Meher, Basudeba Sudhaladeba, Radhanath Ray, Sayeed Mohammed, Bhubanananda Das, A. P. Patro and many others with the support of the public. The newly formed Odisha consisted of six districts namely Cuttack, Puri, Baleswar, Sambalpur, Koraput and Ganjam with its capital at Cuttack. John Austin Hubback took the oath of office and became the first Governor of Odisha Province.

As of 1 April 2019, Odisha has 30 districts.

Celebration
Odisha Dibasa or Utkala Dibasa is celebrated every year on 1 April all over Odisha. Thousands of shops and Jhankis makes this festival more beautiful. There are competitions arranged by popular local politicians like fireworks competition. One can enjoy these fireworks displays which make the sky all the more stunning. On that day all across the country, the family of Odia arranges different cultural programs like a sing-song program. Utkala Dibasa is the day of remembrance for all Odia helps everybody to be united.

See also
List of districts of Odisha

References

Odia culture
History of Odisha
Indian state foundation days
1936 in India
April observances